The IAAF Golden Events were a sporadic series of twelve athletics events organised by the International Amateur Athletics Federation (IAAF) from 1978 to 1982. Aside from the inaugural event in Tokyo, the contests were held in Europe and were attached to independent track and field meetings. The purpose of the events was to raise the profile of the sport outside of Olympic competition. Marking the growing professionalism in athletics, a significant prize pot was given to the winner of the event – a move designed to attract the sport's top athletes to compete against each other at the same meeting. The inaugural prize was an 18-carat gold trophy worth 9,500 US dollars. All twelve events were for men, reflecting their position as the most prominent sex during that period.

The central element of the series was the Golden Mile – a men's mile run contest that launched the series in 1978 and was held annually until 1981. The rivalry of British runners Steve Ovett and Sebastian Coe in this event saw each take two wins and Coe set two mile world records in the process. British athletes were particularly successful in the series and won eight of the twelve events. A sprint format, aggregating an athlete's times in separate 100 metres and 200 metres, was launched in 1979 and repeated in 1981. Long-distance running was also a major element of the series as it featured one 5000 metres race, two 10,000 metres races, and a marathon race over the series history. Field events were in a minority, with one javelin throw and one pole vault being their only appearance. The marathon, in 1982, was the last Golden Event to be held.

The establishment of the IAAF World Championships in Athletics in 1983 saw the IAAF focus on its sport-specific championships as a way of using prizes to generate top level competition. The launch of the IAAF Grand Prix in 1985 formalised the major track and field circuit as a professional series of point-scoring events. The "Golden" was idea revived in the form of the Golden Four in 1992 – a high-prize money, track and field series comprising Oslo, Zurich, Brussels and Berlin (all venues that had hosted Golden Events). This was later expanded and co-opted by the IAAF in 1998 as the IAAF Golden League, which was itself later expanded to the current major track and field series: the IAAF Diamond League.

Some of the events featured title sponsors: the first event was also known as the "Dubai Golden Mile", given its sponsorship by the emirate, and the final event was also known as the "Citizen Golden Marathon", under the patronage of Japanese watchmakers Citizen Holdings.

Editions

Podium finishers

References

Podium finishers
Golden Events. GBR Athletics. Retrieved on 2015-02-26.

Golden Events
Defunct athletics competitions
Recurring sporting events established in 1978
Annual athletics series